Chorus of Interludes is a compilation album by New Zealand composer Peter Jefferies, released on June 24, 1996 through Ajax Records.

Track listing

Personnel 
Peter Jefferies – vocals, piano, drums, cello, production

References 

1996 compilation albums
B-side compilation albums
Peter Jefferies albums